The 2010–11 season was Bolton Wanderers's twelfth season in the Premier League, and their tenth consecutive season in the top-flight of English football. It was the second season with shirt sponsors 188BET.

It covers the period from 1 July 2010 to 30 June 2011. As Bolton Wanderers did not win the 2010–11 Premier League title, it is the 72nd time that they have competed at the top level without winning the title, the most of any club.

The home strip for the 2010–11 season was revealed on 23 April 2010 bearing the 188 Bet logo. The Reebok strip represents a move back to a predominantly all white top. The away strip was revealed on 16 June and is blue with an orange and white trim.

Pre-season

On 27 May, Bolton announced that they would be undertaking a three-game, pre-season tour of North America, taking in matches at Charlotte Eagles, Charleston Battery and Toronto F.C. Further games were announced on 29 May, against Rochdale on 24 July and Morecambe on 28 July, with a reserve team fixture against Fleetwood Town on 30 July. The game at Morecambe was designed to be the opening fixture at their new ground, The Globe Arena, but due to site delays the fixture was cancelled on 14 July and replaced by one at Oldham Athletic. The pre-season schedule announcements were concluded on 1 June when the club announced a small tour of Scotland to play Falkirk on 31 July before a game against Bolton manager Owen Coyle's former charges St Johnstone on 2 August. They also announced that the club's only pre-season game would be against La Liga club Osasuna on 6 August.

A 23-man squad, including new signing Martin Petrov but minus those that had participated in the 2010 FIFA World Cup travelled to the United States on 13 July. The first tour match took place on 14 July against Charlotte Eagles at the Transamerica Field, with Bolton running out 3–0 winners, the goals coming from Gary Cahill, Johan Elmander and Petrov. This was followed three days later with another victory, this time against Charleston Battery at Blackbaud Stadium, the goals this time coming from Kevin Davies and Tamir Cohen in a 2–0 win. The team then travelled across the border to take on Major League Soccer side Toronto where they were joined by Stuart Holden who had played for the USA in the World Cup. The match took place on 21 July at Toronto's BMO Field with the winner pronounced winner of the Carlsberg Cup. After a 1–1 draw, Matty Taylor scoring Bolton's goal, the winner of the trophy was decided by penalties. Holden, Robbie Blake, Sean Davis and Cahill scored for Bolton with Jussi Jääskeläinen saving two of the home side's efforts, thus ensuring Bolton would lift the trophy and finish the tour unbeaten.

On the team's return home they took on local rivals Rochdale at Spotland on the afternoon of 24 July. A Robbie Blake penalty opened the scoring, but Bolton could not finish their League One opponents off and the home side's Chris O'Grady equalised with six minutes remaining. Four days later, a strong side travelled to Oldham Athletic but were well beaten, Tom Eaves scoring all the goals in Oldham's 3–0 win. Eaves would move from Oldham to Bolton a little over two weeks later for an undisclosed fee.

The very end of July saw Bolton travel to Scotland for games against Falkirk and St. Johnstone. The Falkirk game saw the return of Lee Chung-Yong after his extended break following the World Cup. The return of the South Korean could not stop the game ending in a goalless stalemate. Two days later, St Johnstone welcomed Bolton to McDiarmid Park and the English side finished their pre-season away fixtures with a 2–0 victory, Martin Petrov and Johan Elmander scoring their second goals of the summer.

Bolton finished their pre-season schedule with a home match against Osasuna at the Reebok Stadium on 6 August. The result was, again, a 2–0 victory to the home side. Johan Elmander finished as the pre season's leading scorer when he netted early in the game, and Lee Chung-Yong scored his first of the summer shortly afterwards.

Premier League
The fixtures for the 2010–11 season were announced on 17 June, and revealed that Bolton would begin their league campaign by welcoming Fulham to the Reebok Stadium in Mark Hughes' first competitive fixture as Fulham's manager. The match finished goalless with Bolton giving a debut to Martin Petrov. A week later, Bolton travelled to London to take on West Ham United. Goalless at half time, with Carlton Cole having a penalty saved by Jussi Jääskeläinen, Bolton took the lead early in the second half through a Matthew Upson own goal, which was followed by a Johan Elmander header. Although Mark Noble pulled a goal back from the penalty spot after Gary Cahill had been adjudged to have pushed Scott Parker, Elmander scored his second of the game with six minutes remaining. The game saw a debut for Robbie Blake.

Bolton's next match was at home to Birmingham City and was moved to the Sunday to allow for live television coverage. The game started badly for the home team, with Roger Johnson scoring for Birmingham in the first five minutes. Shortly before the end of the first half, the situation got worse when Jussi Jääskeläinen was sent off for slapping Johnson in the face. As a result, Hungarian goalkeeper Ádám Bogdán was brought on for Martin Petrov, to replace Jääskeläinen in goal, marking Bogdán's league debut. Birmingham doubled their advantage early in the second half through Craig Gardner. However, the ten men battled back, first through captain Kevin Davies, scoring his 100th league goal from the penalty spot after he himself was fouled in the area by Johnson, and then Robbie Blake, firing in a free-kick for his first goal for the club. The result saw Bolton finish the weekend in fifth place in the Premier League.

The following round of fixtures took place a fortnight later, due to an international break. On 3 September, Gary Cahill, who had been called up to previous squads without playing, became the first Bolton player to play for England since Michael Ricketts in 2002, in the national team's 4–0 win over Bulgaria.

Bolton returned to league football on 11 September, with an away fixture at Arsenal. Drawing 1–1 at half-time, through Johan Elmander's third league goal of the season, which saw him equal his league tally from the previous season, Bolton were 2–1 down when Cahill was sent off for a tackle on Marouane Chamakh. Playing against ten men, Arsenal dominated the rest of the game and ran out 4–1 winners. As a result, the club fell into the bottom half of the table for the first time that season. The club appealed the three-match ban that Cahill would have to serve for the sending off, but this was rejected. A week later, a second successive away game saw Bolton finish level with Aston Villa, in the last game before Gérard Houllier took over as manager of the Midlands club. Ashley Young put the home side ahead early on from a free-kick, but Bolton had drawn level by the end of the half, Kevin Davies netting his second league goal of the season, to put an end to the scoring.

Bolton's next home was again moved to the Sunday to allow for live television coverage, with the visitors being near neighbours, Manchester United. An early Zat Knight goal, flicking in a corner, gave Bolton the lead, but United equalised halfway through the first half, after Nani had run unchecked through Bolton's half before shooting from just outside the area past the returning Jussi Jääskeläinen. Bolton have only beaten Manchester United once at home in thirty years, but it looked like they would make it twice after Martin Petrov shot home with his unfavoured right foot in the sixty-seventh minute, scoring his first goal for the club in the process. The home side almost made it 3–1 soon after, but Johan Elmander failed to make a one on one with United keeper Edwin van der Sar count, and Bolton were made to rue this chance when Michael Owen, on as a substitute three minutes earlier, flicked on a Nani free-kick into Jääskeläinen's right-hand corner to make the final result 2–2. A fourth game without a win ensured that Bolton remained in the bottom half of the Premier League.

October began with an away game at newly promoted West Bromwich Albion. Kevin Davies set up Johan Elmander in the sixty fourth minute, but James Morrison equalised fourteen minutes later to earn the home side a draw. Elmander's goal, his fourth of the season, meant he had already scored more league goals this season than he had in the whole of the previous season. The day after, Kevin Davies was called up into the England squad for the first time and included in the squad to play Montenegro on 12 October. Later in the week, Gary Cahill was called into the squad as a late replacement for Phil Jagielka, meaning that, for the first time since Eddie Hopkinson and Doug Holden in 1959, Bolton had two representatives in the England squad. Although Cahill didn't make it onto the pitch, Davies made his international debut as a second-half substitute in the game.

Bolton returned to league action on 16 October with a home fixture against Stoke City. A Lee Chung-Yong goal midway through the first half sent Bolton in at halftime ahead, but Rory Delap equalised early in the second half. The game had moved into the fourth minute of injury time when substitute Ivan Klasnić scored what turned out to be the winning goal. Almost immediately, Klasnić was sent off after receiving two yellow cards in the two minutes after his goal.

A week later, Bolton played their first game of the season against near neighbours Wigan Athletic. Bolton would eventually play their closest rivals geographically four times, after drawing their FA Cup Fourth round tie. Hugo Rodallega opened the scoring at the DW Stadium but this was swiftly equalised by Johan Elmander as Bolton consolidated their position in the top half of the Premier League. However, the following Sunday, a late Maxi Rodríguez goal would see Liverpool beat Bolton and continue their good form at the Reebok Stadium, where they had not lost since 2006. The result saw Bolton finish October in tenth place.

November opened with a home fixture against Tottenham Hotspur, who had not won a league game at the Reebok Stadium. This run continued as two goals from Kevin Davies and a goal apiece for Grétar Steinsson and Martin Petrov saw Bolton run out 4–2 winners. This began a run of five unbeaten games throughout the month of November. On 10 November, a late Jermaine Beckford goal saw Everton salvage a draw at Goodison Park after Ivan Klasnić had put Bolton ahead. The following Saturday, Bolton raced into a 3–0 lead at Wolverhampton Wanderers through a Richard Stearman own goal, a Johan Elmander solo effort and a Stuart Holden strike, before Wolves pulled back two goals. A week later, Bolton earned their largest win of the season when Newcastle United came to the Reebok Stadium. This was the first game that former captain Kevin Nolan had played at Bolton since his move to Newcastle in January 2009. Two converted penalties by Kevin Davies, two more goals for Johan Elmander and one for Lee Chung-yong gave Bolton a 5–1 win. Bolton finished the month by welcoming Blackpool to the Reebok Stadium for the first time. It was also the first time the clubs had met for seventeen years. Trailing by two goals halfway through the second half, Bolton pulled the goals back, first through a Martin Petrov free kick and then a team effort completed by Mark Davies. Bolton finished the month in fifth place and challenging for European football.

December opened with a game at Manchester City who, despite having Aleksandar Kolarov sent off in the second half, kept hold of their one-goal lead, given to them in the first half by Carlos Tevez. The week after, Bolton themselves had a man sent off, with Mark Davies receiving his marching orders for elbowing Phil Jones with the game goalless. Fabrice Muamba then scored his first goal of the season but Blackburn equalised late on, with Mame Biram Diouf bringing the scores level. However, just one minute later, Stuart Holden ran onto a Kevin Davies header to score from twenty yards. The game would prove to be the last as Blackburn manager for former Bolton boss Sam Allardyce, who was fired the day after.

League table

Results summary

Results per matchday 

Last updated: 22 May 2011Source: Bolton Wanderers F.C.Note: Premier League fixtures not listed due to copyright

FA Cup
Bolton Wanderers entered the 2010–11 FA Cup at the Third Round stage, the draw being made on 28 November 2010. Bolton were drawn against non-league opposition in the form of York City, the first time that they had played a non-league side since beating Yeovil Town ten years previously. The match was played on 8 January 2011.

Bolton started the game showing seven changes from their previous game against Wigan Athletic and struggled to break down York. It took the introduction of first choice forwards Kevin Davies and Johan Elmander to make the difference, Davies scoring in the eighty-third minute and Elmander scoring with a drive from outside the box six minutes later.

The draw for the fourth round was made the following afternoon and saw Bolton drawn against their nearest local rivals, Wigan Athletic. The match took place on 29 January and ended goalless. The draw for the fifth round took place the day after and gave the winner of the replay an away tie at Fulham on 20 February. The replay took place at the DW Stadium on 16 February, where a single goal from Ivan Klasnić took Bolton through to the fifth round. The draw for the sixth round took place whilst Bolton were still playing at Craven Cottage and saw the winners of the game drawn away at Birmingham City. Again, a single Klasnić goal scored early in the first half, saw Bolton go through to the quarter-finals.

The quarter-final was played on 12 April and was shown live on ESPN. A goal early in the first half by Johan Elmander was cancelled out by Cameron Jerome before half-time, the first goal that Bolton had conceded in that year's competition. A Kevin Davies penalty restored Bolton's lead in the second half, but Kevin Phillips hit a dipping shot over Jussi Jääskeläinen, playing his 500th game for Bolton, to again bring Birmingham level. However, a Lee Chung-yong header, early in added time, completed the scoring and took Bolton into the Semi-final for the first time in eleven years. The day after, England coaches Hope Powell and Fabio Capello performed the semi-final draw, and Bolton was paired with Stoke City with Bolton the home team for the game at Wembley Stadium.

The game was played on 17 April, with whoever won the tie knowing that they would be playing Manchester City in the final after their victory over Manchester United the day before. Stoke ran out 5–0 victors, the largest FA Cup Semi-final win since before World War II, with former Bolton player Jonathan Walters scoring twice. Bolton captain Kevin Davies later apologised to the fans for the performance of the players.

League Cup
Bolton Wanderers entered the 2010–11 Football League Cup at the Second Round stage, the draw being made on 11 August 2010. It saw Bolton given an away tie at League One side Southampton, who they had not faced since Southampton were relegated from the Premier League in 2005. The game was played on 24 August and saw the debut of young Hungarian goalkeeper Ádám Bogdán. He kept a clean sheet in a 1–0 win, Ivan Klasnić scoring the only goal in the first half.

The draw for the third round was made on 29 August and saw Owen Coyle's side drawn against his previous club Burnley, who he had left to join Bolton the previous January, with the game played at Turf Moor on 21 September. Bolton made numerous changes to the team that had played the previous Saturday at Aston Villa. A Wade Elliott goal, shortly before half time, was the only goal of the game and brought to an end Bolton's participation in the competition.

Squad statistics

Statistics accurate as of match played 22 May 2011

Transfers
On the commencement of the summer transfer window on 1 July, Portuguese striker Ricardo Vaz Tê, who has been at the club since 2003, was released. At the same time, young Australian midfielder Aaron Mooy turned down the chance of a new contract and also left. Coming into the club were Martin Petrov, signed on a free transfer from Manchester City and Robbie Blake from manager Owen Coyle's former club Burnley, also on a free transfer. In the middle of July, as the team prepared to fly to the United States for their pre season tour, the club agreed a season long loan deal with Wigan Athletic for second choice goalkeeper Ali Al-Habsi. Later in the month, Spain under-19 international Marcos Alonso signed from Spain's giants Real Madrid for an undisclosed fee. This allowed the club to let long serving defender Nicky Hunt leave on a free transfer to Bristol City three days later.

August saw the club sign Croatian international Ivan Klasnić, who had been at the club the previous season on loan, from Nantes after the player had negotiated his release from the French club, as well as young striker Tom Eaves from Oldham Athletic for an undisclosed fee. Eaves had scored a hat trick for Oldham against Bolton in a friendly a fortnight earlier. A day after Eaves was signed, Bolton sold Chris Basham to Premier League new boys Blackpool, again for an undisclosed fee.

As the summer transfer window closed, a loan deal with Benfica of Portugal was made to bring young Spanish international Rodrigo to the Reebok Stadium for the season. At the same time, Bolton agreed a mutual termination with Nigerian international Danny Shittu, and he left the club.

As the closure of the transfer window does not preclude Premier League clubs loaning players to lower league teams, Danny Ward joined Championship team Coventry City until the New Year, but this was cut short in the middle of October when the player suffered a groin injury and returned to Bolton. Tope Obadeyi was loaned to League Two side Shrewsbury Town for an initial month in mid October and this loan was extended at its conclusion for another month.

When the January transfer window opened, Irish international Andy O'Brien, who had been on loan at Championship team Leeds United since the end of October, joined them on a permanent basis. As a replacement, Bolton signed David Wheater from Middlesbrough for an undisclosed fee. Riga Mustapha, who had rejected a deal to terminate his contract in September, finally agreed and left the club after making twenty two appearances since he joined in 2008. On transfer deadline day, Bolton signed Daniel Sturridge on loan from Chelsea until the end of the season.

In

Out

Loan in

Loan out

Mid-season friendlies

Last updated: 8 January 2011Source: Bolton Wanderers F.C.

Notes

References

2010-11
2010–11 Premier League by team